The Punalur Suspension Bridge, located in Punalur is the 146-year-old motorable Bridge in Kerala, which was built by Travancore Government and is now a historical attraction. The suspension bridge was built to prevent wild animals from crossing into the town from the forest area of old Kattupathanapuram.

History and Construction 

 

The Punalur Suspension Bridge is the first motorable bridge in South India. The suspension bridge crossing the river is the only suspended-deck type in south India. Built in 1877 by Albert Henry across the Kallada River, this huge bridge was suspended by two spans and was used for vehicular movement. Construction took more than six years. It is said that after completion of the bridge people hesitated to walk over the bridge. In order to prove the strength of the bridge the engineer and his family passed under the bridge in a country boat while six elephants were walking over it. Now the bridge is of historical interest and is a major tourist attraction.

Reason for the construction 

The main concept behind the construction of this bridge was that areas on the other side of the river Kallada was dense forests. A bridge was necessary. It was also built to prevent wild animals from getting to the populated side, a bridge which shakes when some one gets on it was built, this shaking scared off the animals and they wouldn't cross the bridge.

Method of Construction 

The bridge is connected to four wells. The iron rods of the bridge is connected to the clips, situated in the wells. Each well is about 100 feet deep and no one since knows the engineering behind the construction of this bridge. It still remains a mystery.

Replacement for the suspension bridge 

A new concrete bridge was built near to the Punalur Suspension Bridge in 1972 due to heavy traffic on the National Highway 208, a new strong bridge was built.

Renovation 

The bridge was recently repaired and renovated by the government of Kerala. The structure was strengthened, new wood panels of the same tree (Kambakom) which was first used in the construction were fit, the steel armrests and the stone columns were painted, night lamps were installed and a new park and resting place were made near the bridge.

References

External links 

 SketchUp Model of the Bridge

Bridges in Kerala
Buildings and structures in Kollam district
1877 establishments in India
Bridges completed in 1877
Suspension bridges in India
Transport in Kollam district